Sea Life Arizona is a 26,000 square foot interactive aquarium located at Arizona Mills mall in Tempe, Arizona. The aquarium contains thousands of aquatic creatures, plus interactive touch pools and a 360° ocean tunnel. Sea Life Arizona is owned and operated by Merlin Entertainments, which operates over thirty other aquariums in eleven countries on two continents. Eight of these are in the United States.

Main species

Conservation

Sea Life Arizona provides permanent homes for injured or disabled aquatic creatures who would have otherwise been killed or euthanized. In 2012 the facility became the home of an endangered green sea turtle named Ziva, who was placed in the Tempe aquarium's 161,000 gallon display.

Sea Life aquariums worldwide breed many species of seahorse, which are at risk of extinction because of overfishing and trade. Some Sea Life facilities also have seahorse exhibits to educate visitors about the creatures and their threatened status.

References

Sea Life Centres
Buildings and structures in Tempe, Arizona
Tourist attractions in Tempe, Arizona
Aquaria in Arizona
Cinemas and movie theaters in Arizona